The Old St. Luke's Hospital is a historic U.S. hospital in Jacksonville, Florida. It is located at 314 North Palmetto Street. The hospital was originally built in 1878 at a cost of about $6,000. On July 24, 1972, it was added to the U.S. National Register of Historic Places.

The building currently houses the archives of the Jacksonville Historical Society.

Notable people
 Martha Reed Mitchell (1818-1902), philanthropist

See also
 St. Vincent's Medical Center Southside, formerly known as St. Luke's Hospital

References

External links

 Duval County listings at National Register of Historic Places
 Duval County listings at Florida's Office of Cultural and Historical Programs
 Jacksonville Historical Society's website at jaxhistory.com

Buildings and structures in Jacksonville, Florida
History of Jacksonville, Florida
Hospitals in Florida
National Register of Historic Places in Jacksonville, Florida
Hospital buildings on the National Register of Historic Places in Florida
Hospitals in Jacksonville, Florida